Serebrennikov or Serebrenikov (Russian, Ukrainian: Серебренников or Серебреников) is a Russian masculine surname originating from the word serebrennik, meaning silversmith; its feminine counterpart is Serebrennikova or Serebrenikova. Notable persons with the surname include:

Pyotr Serebrennikov, (1853–1905), Russian naval captain
Gennady Serebrennikov (born 1958), Russian serial killer
 Kirill Serebrennikov (born 1969), Russian theatre and film director
 Leonid Serebrennikov (born 1947), Soviet and Russian actor and singer
 Serhiy Serebrennikov (born 1976), Russian and Ukrainian footballer

See also
Serebryakov

References

Russian-language surnames